Mount Hopeless is a mountain in the Central Tablelands region of New South Wales, Australia.

See also 
 
List of mountains of Australia

References

Hopeless
Hopeless